Gingerbread Man is an album by American art rock group The Residents, released in 1995. It was their first foray into computer graphics. Original versions of the CD were "enhanced" with animations that followed the music when played on a computer. The animations served as a basis for the costumes of the characters when a number of the songs were performed in the 25th anniversary shows in 1997. Later the same year regular CDs, with just the music, were released. The inside cover of the album special edition was held together with a branded label of Velcro.

Track listing
 "The Weaver: The fool and the death-maker die alone"
 "The Dying Oilman: Blinded by the hostages of fortune"
 "The Confused Transsexual: Stamen and pistillate together again"
 "The Sold-Out Artist: Black are the legs inside the white sepulchre"
 "The Ascetic: Shadows doubt the strength of the sun"
 "The Old Soldier: Safety sells, but war always wins"
 "The Aging Musician: Narcissus knows no one naked"
 "The Butcher: The flesh of animals angers anew… and moos"
 "The Old Woman: Kissless are the isolated, rootless are their tongues"
 "Ginger's Lament"

References

The Residents albums
1994 albums